The Women's 10,000 metres event at the 2011 European Athletics U23 Championships was held in Ostrava, Czech Republic, at Městský stadion on 15 July.

Medalists

Results

Final
15 July 2011 / 17:20

†: Meryem Erdoğan did not finish, but was disqualified later for infringement of IAAF doping rules.

Intermediate times:
1000m: 3:35.74 Maor Tyuri 
2000m: 7:05.66 Maor Tyuri 
3000m: 10:22.56 Layes Abdullayeva 
4000m: 13:40.73 Layes Abdullayeva 
5000m: 16:45.36 Layes Abdullayeva 
6000m: 19:52.32 Layes Abdullayeva 
7000m: 22:56.00 Layes Abdullayeva 
8000m: 26:03.92 Layes Abdullayeva 
9000m: 29:11.92 Layes Abdullayeva

Participation
According to an unofficial count, 16 athletes from 14 countries participated in the event.

References

10,000 metres
10,000 metres at the European Athletics U23 Championships
2011 in women's athletics